Samuel Pargiter-Fuller (1690–1722) was a M.P. for Petersfield.

A Whig, he was the eldest son of Samuel Pargiter, a merchant of St. Andrew, Holborn and Consul at Nice; and his wife, Frances. In 1713 he married Margaret, daughter and heir of Douse Fuller of Stedham and assumed the additional name of Fuller.

References

17th-century English people
18th-century English people
1690 births
1722 deaths
People from Holborn
British MPs 1715–1722